Charles Douglas-Home may refer to:

Charles Douglas-Home, 12th Earl of Home (1834–1918)
Charles Douglas-Home (journalist) (1937–1985), Scottish journalist 
Charles Douglas-Home, 13th Earl of Home (1873–1951)

See also
Charles Douglas (disambiguation)